The Innovation Act of the 114th Congress is a bill that would change the rules and regulations surrounding patent infringement lawsuits in an attempt to reduce enforceability of patents.

This article primarily describes the current version of this bill in the 114th United States Congress, which was sent to the House on June 11, 2015 but has not been voted by the United States House or the United States Senate.

The bill is a reintroduction of the failed bill in the 113th United States Congress by its original sponsor, Rep. Bob Goodlatte (R, VA-6), that had accumulated 16 cosponsors.

Background
Patent litigation has significantly decreased since 2013, when the Innovation Act—the most recent patent bill —was introduced. Patent litigation has since been reported as primarily initiated by manufacturers, reducing support for a new patent law.

Current law allows universities, small tech startup and other patent owners to file complaints that specify what products they think infringe their patents. A letter sent by the Association of American Universities to Rep. Goodlatte asserts that H.R. 9 would:

make it more difficult and expensive for patent holders to defend their rights in good faith.  

In addition, the National Venture Capital Association has stated opposition to H.R. 9 as making it:

harder for startups to enforce their patent rights against entrenched competitors or to defend themselves in patent cases brought by those competitors or even by larger Non-Practicing Entities" ... "making it more difficult to invest in patent-reliant startups" "that would pose a threat of the entrepreneurial ecosystem.

Nonetheless, the bill would require "a party alleging infringement in a civil action involving a claim for relief arising under any Act of Congress relating to patents to include in the court pleadings, unless the information is not reasonably accessible, specified details concerning: (1) each claim of each patent allegedly infringed (2) for each claim of indirect infringement, the acts of the alleged indirect infringer that contribute to, or are inducing, a direct infringement (3) the principal business of the party alleging infringement (4) the authority of the party alleging infringement to assert each patent and the grounds for the court's jurisdiction (5) each complaint filed that asserts any of the same patents (6) and whether the patent is essential or has potential to become essential to a standard-setting body, as well as whether the United States or a foreign government has imposed any specific licensing requirements."

The bill would also require plaintiffs that lose their suit to pay the costs incurred by the winning defendant.

Procedural history
The Innovation Act was introduced into the United States House of Representatives on February 5, 2015 by Rep. Goodlatte. It was referred to the United States House Committee on the Judiciary.

Opponents of the bill argued that the law would hurt smaller inventors that are trying to defend their patents from larger companies with more money to spend on legal action. In February 2015 the Association of Public and Land-grant Universities published a press release and an open letter to the senior members of the House and Senate Committees on the Judiciary, documenting their objections:
The provisions with the most potential for damaging university technology transfer include fee-shifting and joinder. Most universities, non-profit technology transfer organizations, and their licensees — often small businesses and start-ups— lack extensive resources to enforce their patents. The heightened litigation risks created by the fee-shifting and joinder provisions in the Innovation Act would devalue patents, creating uncertainty that would undermine the incentives of potential licensees and venture capitalists to invest in commercialization of university innovation.

Dissenting views in Congress

6 former supporters of H.R. 9 on the House Judiciary Committee have dropped their support for H.R. 9, four Republican and 2 Democrats.
In addition, two other Democrats on the committee who voted for the failed Innovation Act in the 113th Congress who now oppose H.R. 9 sent out a 'dear colleague' letter in early July 2015 urging others to defect. They cited a slew of Supreme Court cases on patents that have changed precedent as well as changes at the U.S. Patent and Trademark Office stating:. 

The patent landscape has changed dramatically in the past two years, and the changes (of the America Invents Act of 2011) are working to eliminate the need for the sweeping changes proposed in H.R. 9.

Five Democrats dissented to the Innovation Act of the 113th Congress: John Conyers (MI), Sheila Jackson Lee (TX), Hank Johnson (GA), Bobby Scott (VA), and Mel Watt (NC).   They "believe[d] that any serious reform of the patent laws" must end fee diversion "to ensure adequate hiring, proper training of examiners, and sustained patent quality"; they also stated that H.R.3309 "creates an imbalance in the patent system skewed in favor of big corporate interests, negatively impact all patent owners thereby undermining innovation, and would encroach on our longstanding deference to the prerogatives of the Judiciary."  They wanted provisions "concerning real parties in interest, customer stays, and small business assistance" as well as a "revolving fund to end fee diversion", a "study on the practice of deceptive demand letters and a report with tailored recommendations on changes to laws and regulations that would deter the use of those letters."

Senate actions
On April 29, 2015, Senator Charles Grassley, the Chairman of the Senate Committee on the Judiciary introduced the Patent Act (S. 1137) in response to the Innovation Act.
On May 7, 2015, the full Senate Judiciary Committee held a hearing that included testimony by Kevin H. Rhodes (V.P. and Chief Intellectual Property Counsel on behalf of the Coalition for 21st Century Patent Reform) proposing that the standard of review for the validity of patents in Inter Partes Review (IPR) at the Patent Trial and Appeal Board (PTAB) be changed from "preponderance of evidence" to "clear and convincing evidence" as consistent with federal courts.  Many policy observers have called for drastic changes to the PTAB IPR procedure as a result of studies that show in 73 percent of IPR petitions, all of the claims were deemed unpatentable, and in additional 15 of IPR petitions, some of the claims were deemed unpatentable."  The proposed amendments were made amid growing concern by ethical drug companies about the high rate of invalidation of patents by the PTAB in IPR. and comments by the Judge Rader, the former Chief Justice of the Federal Circuit that the PTAB is the "death squad" of patents.

In regards to the predecessor bill that failed in 113th Congress, in May 2014, Senator Patrick Leahy, the Chairman of the Senate Committee on the Judiciary, announced he was "taking the patent bill off the Senate Judiciary Committee agenda."  According to Leahy: 
Unfortunately, there has been no agreement on how to combat the scourge of patent trolls on our economy without burdening the companies and universities who rely on the patent system every day to protect their inventions.  We have heard repeated concerns that the House-passed bill went beyond the scope of addressing patent trolls, and would have severe unintended consequences on legitimate patent holders who employ thousands of Americans.

which are problems that still plague the patent bills being circulated in the House and the Senate.

Congressional Budget Office report
This summary is provided by the Congressional Budget Office, as ordered reported by the House Committee on the Judiciary on June 11, 2015. This is a public domain source.

The Congressional Budget Office (CBO) estimates that implementing H.R. 9 would cost $7 million per year over the 2016–2020 period, assuming appropriation of the necessary amounts, mainly for reports to be prepared by the Administrative Office of the United States Courts (AOUSC) and the Government Accountability Office and administrative costs incurred by the AOUSC associated with new judicial procedures. Pay-as-you-go procedures do not apply to this legislation because it would not affect direct spending or revenues.
 
Based on information from the Patent and Trademark Office (PTO), the CBO also estimates that implementing H.R. 9 would have a gross cost to the PTO of about $7 million per year. However, the PTO is authorized to collect fees sufficient to offset its operating expenses; therefore, the CBO estimates that the net budgetary effect of PTO's activities undertaken to implement H.R. 9 would not be significant, assuming appropriation actions consistent with the agency's authorities.
 
H.R. 9 would change administrative and judicial processes in ways that make enforcement of patents more difficult. The CBO expects that, by requiring inventors to be more specific in pleadings to the court, awarding attorney fees to the prevailing party, and limiting discovery early in an infringement proceeding, the bill would affect the decisions of inventors to initiate lawsuits for patent infringement. 
 
H.R. 9 would make several adjustments to judicial procedures for patent infringement cases, including which parties may join a suit and when a court is required to grant a motion to stay an action. Further, the bill would require the courts to award the prevailing party reasonable fees and other expenses incurred in connection with such cases. The bill also would require the AOUSC to develop rules and procedures related to the discovery of evidence in lawsuits for patent infringement. 
 
The bill would change procedures that the PTO has in place to examine patent applications, award patents, and determine the validity of a patent that has already been granted. Among other things, H.R. 9 would specify that the agency use methods similar to those used in district courts to evaluate the validity of a patent. The bill also would require the agency to develop new databases to make information about patent ownership and litigation available on its website, perform an additional review of certain declarations made on original applications, and prepare several studies and reports on patent ownership and the behavior of certain patent owners. 
 
H.R. 9 would impose a mandate as defined in the Unfunded Mandates Reform Act (UMRA) on both public and private entities because the PTO would charge fees to offset the costs incurred to collect and make some information related to patents publicly available. Other provisions in the bill also would result in increased patent fees. The requirement to pay those fees would be a mandate because the federal government controls the patent and trademark system, and no reasonable alternatives to that system exist. 
 
Based on information from PTO, the CBO estimates that the annual cost to comply with the mandate would be about $7 million, with less than $1 50,000 of those costs accruing to public entities and the rest accruing to private entities. Therefore, the cost for public and private entities to comply with the mandate would fall below the annual thresholds established in UMRA for intergovernmental and private-sector mandates ($77 million and $154 million in 2015, respectively, adjusted annually for inflation).

See also
Markman hearing
Patent infringement under United States law
List of bills in the 114th United States Congress

References

External links

Library of Congress – Thomas H.R. 9
beta.congress.gov H.R. 9
H.R. 9 from GovTrack.us 
H.R. 9 from OpenCongress.org 
H.R. 9 from WashingtonWatch.com

Proposed legislation of the 114th United States Congress
United States federal patent legislation
Discovery and invention controversies